Myriam Cliche (1961 – 18 November 2022) was a Canadian poet, illustrator, artisan, and linguist. She primarily wrote in French for the Montreal-based publishing house L'Oie de Cravan.

Biography
Cliche was the author of several books:
La Voix de l'autre berger (1992)
1971 Oiseau (1996)
Les peintures de forêt (2000)
Fanette chaque jour (2002)
Myriam et le loup (2005)
Fleuve Russe (2008)

Cliche also participated in several artistic projects. In 1986, she contributed to the production of the "La Calembredaine" software alongside Alain Bergeron, an artist and programmer. In 1991, she began writing for the magazine Revue des animaux. The final edition of the magazine was published in June 2000. In 2002, she illustrated poem P'tite Peau, written by Karina Mancini.

Cliche died from cancer on 18 November 2022, at the age of 61.

References

1961 births
2022 deaths
French Quebecers
Writers from Sherbrooke
20th-century Canadian poets
21st-century Canadian poets